Herts/Middlesex 2 is a tier 10 English Rugby Union league. It is organised by the London and South East Division Rugby Football Union and is the second division competition for clubs in Hertfordshire and parts of north-west London that traditionally was encompassed by the historic county of Middlesex.  Each year some of the clubs in this division also take part in the RFU Junior Vase - a level 9-12 national competition.

Promoted teams move up to Herts/Middlesex 1 and there is currently no relegation (prior to 2013-14 teams had dropped into Herts/Middlesex 3). Over the course of its history, Herts/Middlesex 2 has veered between regional and single division formats.

Participating Clubs 2021-22

The teams competing in 2021-22 achieved their places in the league based on performances in 2019–20, the 'previous season' column in the table below refers to that season not 2020–21.

Pinner & Grammarians finished 11th in 2019-20 and whilst not relegated, did not return for 2021-22 and instead have dropped to Herts Merit 4SW.

Season 2020–21

On 30 October the RFU announced that a decision had been taken to cancel Adult Competitive Leagues (National League 1 and below) for the 2020/21 season meaning Herts/Middlesex 2 was not contested.

Participating Clubs 2019-20

Participating Clubs 2018-19

Participating Clubs 2017-18

Participating Clubs 2016-17
Bank of England (relegated from Herts/Middlesex 1)
Chess Valley
Cuffley
Haringey Rhinos
Harlequin Amateurs
Mill Hill
Old Isleworthians
Old Milhallians (relegated from Herts/Middlesex 1)
Thamesians
Uxbridge
Watford
West London

Participating Clubs 2015-16
Chess Valley
Feltham (relegated from Herts/Middlesex 1)
Haringey Rhinos (relegated from Herts/Middlesex 1)
Harlequin Amateurs
Hendon
Ickenham
Mill Hill
Old Isleworthians
Saracens Amateurs
Thamesians
Uxbridge
Watford
West London

Participating Clubs 2014-15
Chess Valley
Harlequin Amateurs
Hendon
Hillingdon Abbots
Ickenham
London French
Mill Hill
Old Isleworthains
Quintin
Saracens Amateurs
Thamesians
Uxbridge
Watford
West London

Participating Clubs 2013-14
Chess Valley
Feltham
Hillingdon Abbots	
Hendon 
Ickenham
London Welsh Amateurs
Quintin
Saracens Amateurs
Thamesians
Uxbridge

Participating Clubs 2012-13
Chess Valley	
Hillingdon Abbots
Ickenham
Kilburn Cosmos	
Old Grammarians
Old Isleworthians
Pinner & Grammarians
Quintin	
Royston
Saracens Amateurs
Uxbridge

Participating Clubs 2009-10
Belsize Park
Ickenham
London French
Old Isleworthians
Old Merchant Taylors'
Old Millhillians
Old Tottonians
Pinner and Grammarians
Royston 
Quintin 
Uxbridge

Original teams

When this division began in 1996 it contained the following teams:

Actonians - transferred from Middlesex 1 (10th)
CS Stags 1863 - transferred from Middlesex 1 (3rd)
Datchworth - transferred from Hertfordshire 1 (3rd)
Enfield Ignatians - promoted from Middlesex 2 (champions)
Harrow - transferred from Middlesex 1 (4th)
H.A.C. - transferred from Middlesex 1 (6th)
London New Zealand - relegated from Herts/Middlesex (13th)
Old Haberdashers - transferred from Middlesex 1 (5th)
Old Paulines - transferred from Middlesex 1 (7th)
Stevenage Town - transferred from Hertfordshire 1 (2nd)
Twickenham - transferred from Middlesex 1 (9th)
Upper Clapton - relegated from Herts/Middlesex (12th)
Wembley - transferred from Middlesex 1 (8th)

Herts/Middlesex 2 Honours

Promotion play-offs
Between 2004 and 2008 there was a play-off between the runners-up of Herts/Middlesex 2 North and Herts/Middlesex 2 South for the third and final promotion place to Herts/Middlesex 1. The team with the superior league record has home advantage in the tie.

The playoffs were ended before the 2008–09 season when the two regional divisions re-merged into a single division called Herts/Middlesex 2.  At the end of the 2007–08 season the Herts/Middlesex 2 North teams had been the most successful with three wins to the Herts/Middlesex 2 South teams one; and the home team has won promotion on all four occasions.

Number of league titles

Bank Of England (2)
Harlequin Amateurs (2)
Harrow (2)
Kilburn Cosmos (2)
Old Actonians (2)
Saracens Amateurs (2)
Civil Service (1)
Ealing Trailfinders 1871 (1)
Feltham (1)
Finsbury Park (1)
H.A.C. (1)
Hammersmith & Fulham (1)
Haringey Rhinos (1)
Hemel Hempstead (1)
Hendon (1)
Hillingdon Abbots (1)
Mill Hill (1)
Northolt (1)
Old Millhillians (1)
Old Streetonians (1)
UCS Old Boys (1)

See also
London & SE Division RFU
Hertfordshire RFU
Middlesex RFU
English rugby union system
Rugby union in England

Notes

References

10
Rugby union in Hertfordshire
Rugby union in Middlesex